Manoba chirgwini is a moth in the family Nolidae. It was described by Jeremy Daniel Holloway in 2003. It is found on Borneo. The habitat consists of upper montane forests.

The length of the forewings is about 7 mm.

References

Moths described in 2003
Nolinae